Jeanne Fichel, née Samson (1849–1906) was a French genre painter.

Jeanne Fichel was born in Lyon and became a pupil of Eugène Fichel, whom she later married. She showed works at the Paris Salon from 1869 onwards. Her 1878 work The Bouquet was included in the book Women Painters of the World.

References

Recently auctioned works

1849 births
1906 deaths
Artists from Lyon
French women painters